Symphyotrichum laurentianum (formerly Aster laurentianus) is a critically imperiled species of flowering plant in the family Asteraceae endemic to the southern shores of the Gulf of St. Lawrence in Canada.

Citations

References

 
 

laurentianum
Endemic flora of Canada
Plants described in 1914
Taxa named by Merritt Lyndon Fernald